In the context of the recitation of the Quran, tajwīd ('elocution') is a set of rules for the correct pronunciation of the letters with all their qualities and applying the various traditional methods of recitation (Qira'at). In Arabic, the term tajwīd is derived from the verb جود, from the triliteral root  , meaning enhancement or to make something excellent. Technically, it means giving every letter its right in reciting the Qur'an.

So the scholars of the Qur’an began to write the rules and rules of intonation.

History
The history of Quranic recitation is tied to the history of qira'at, as each reciter had their own set of tajwid rules, with much overlap between them.

Abu Ubaid al-Qasim bin Salam (774 - 838 CE) was the first to develop a recorded science for tajwid, giving the rules of tajwid names and putting it into writing in his book called al-Qiraat. He wrote about 25 reciters, including the 7 mutawatir reciters. He made the reality, transmitted through reciters of every generation, a science with defined rules, terms, and enunciation.

Abu Bakr Ibn Mujāhid (859 - 936 CE) wrote a book called Kitab al-Sab’ fil-qirā’āt "The Seven of the Recitations." He is the first to limit the number of recitations to the seven known.

Imam Al-Shatibi (1320 - 1388 CE) wrote a poem outlining the two most famous ways passed down from each of seven strong imams, known as ash-Shatibiyyah. In it, he documented the rules of recitation of Naafi’, Ibn Katheer, Abu ‘Amr, Ibn ‘Aamir, ‘Aasim, al-Kisaa’i, and Hamzah. It is 1173 lines long and a major reference for the seven qira’aat.

Ibn al-Jazari (1350 - 1429 CE) wrote two large poems about Qira'at and tajwid. One was Durrat Al-Maa'nia, in the readings of three major reciters, added to the seven in the Shatibiyyah, making it ten. The other is Tayyibat An-Nashr, which is 1014 lines on the ten major reciters in great detail, of which he also wrote a commentary.

Religious Obligation
Knowledge of the actual tajwīd rules is a community duty (farḍ al-kifāya). There is a difference of opinion on the ruling for individuals. Dr. Shadee Elmasry states that it is an individual obligation (farḍ al-'ayn) on every Muslim to recite the opening chapter of the Qur'an (al-fatiha) with correct tajwīd, though they do not need to know the terms and definitions of the rules themselves. Sheikh Zakariyya al-Ansari stated that it is sinful to recite in a way that changes the meaning or changes the grammar. If it does not change these two things, then it is not sinful, even if it is a clear error.

Qur'an and Hadith on Tajwīd
The central Quranic verse about tajwid is verse 73:4: "...and recite the Qur'an with measured recitation." The word , as used in this verse, is often also used in hadith in conjunction with its command. It means to articulate slowly, carefully, and precisely.

Abu Dawud's hadith collection has a chapter heading titled "Recommendation of (reciting with)  in the Qur'an." It begins with the narration: "The Messenger of Allah peace and blessings be upon him said: One who was devoted to the Qur'an will be told to recite, ascend and recite carefully as he recited carefully when he was in the world, for he will reach his abode when he comes to the last verse he recites (Sunan Abi Dawud 1464)." This narration describes the importance of the manner of recitation and its positive effects in the afterlife. The next narration describes the importance of prolongation: "Qatadah said: I asked Anas about the recitation of the Qur'an by the Prophet, peace and blessings be upon him. He said: He used to express all the long accents clearly (Sunan Abi Dawud 1465)." This narration also shows that even the companions of the prophet used some terms which are still used today in  rules.

Arabic alphabet and grammar 

The Arabic alphabet has 28 basic letters, plus hamzah.

The Arabic definite article is  al- (i.e. the letter alif followed by ). "Solar" and "lunar" became descriptions for these instances as the words for "the moon" and "the sun" (al-qamar and ash-shams, respectively) are examples of this rule.

Emission points 

There are 17 emission points (makhārij al-ḥurūf) of the letters, located in various regions of the throat, tongue, lips, nose, and the mouth as a whole for the prolonged (madd or mudd) letters.

The manner of articulation (ṣifat al-ḥurūf) refers to the different attributes of the letters. Some of the characteristics have opposites, while some are individual. An example of a characteristic would be the fricative consonant sound called ṣafīr, which is an attribute of air escaping from a tube.

Thickness and thinness

The emphatic consonants , known as  letters, are pronounced with a "heavy accent". This is done by either pharyngealization /ˤ/, i.e. pronounced while squeezing one's voicebox, or by velarization /ˠ/. The remaining letters – the muraqqaq – have a "light accent" (tarqīq) as they are pronounced normally, without pharyngealization (except , which is often considered a pharyngeal sound).

It is heavy if the first preceding voweled letter is accompanied by a fatḥah or ḍammah.

 is only heavy in the word .

Prolongation 

Prolongation refers to the number of morae (beats of time) that are pronounced when a voweled letter is followed by a madd letter (alif, yāʼ or wāw). The number of morae then becomes two. If these are at the end of the sentence, such as in all the verses in "al-Fatiha", then the number of morae can be more than two, but must be consistent from verse to verse.

Sākinah (vowelless) letters

Nūn sākinah and tanwīn
Nūn sākinah refers to instances where the letter nūn is accompanied by a sukun sign, some cases of which involve tanwīns nun with a sukun. There are then four ways it should be pronounced, depending on which letter immediately follows:

Iẓhār 

  ("clarity"): the nūn sound is pronounced clearly without additional modifications when followed by "letters of the throat". Consider the nūn with a sukun pronounced regularly in the beginning of the last verse in "al-Fatiha":

Iqlāb 

Additionally, it is pronounced with ghunnah, i.e. nasalization which can be held  for two morae. Consider the nūn sound on the tanwīn on the letter jīm that is pronounced as a mīm instead in the chapter Al-Hajj:

Idghām 

Idghām only applies between two words and not in the middle of a word. Consider for example the nūn that is not pronounced in the fifth line (the Shahada) in the Call to Prayer:

Ikhfāʼ 

  ("concealment"): the nūn sound is not fully pronounced (i.e. the tongue does not make full contact with the roof of the mouth as in a regular /n/ sound) if it is followed by any letters other than those already listed, includes a ghunnah. Consider the nūn that is suppressed in the second verse of the chapter Al-Falaq:

Mīm sākinah
The term mīm sākinah refers to instances where the letter mīm is accompanied by a sukun. There are then three ways it should be pronounced, depending on which letter immediately follows:
  ("labial merging") when followed by another mīm (usually indicated by a ): the mīm is then merged with the following mīm and includes a ghunnah;

 ("labial clarity"): the mīm is pronounced clearly with no amendment when followed by any letters other than those already listed.

Qalqalah 

The "lesser bounce" occurs when the letter is in the middle of a word or at the end of the word but the reader joins it to the next word. A "medium bounce" is given when the letter is at the end of the word but is not accompanied by a shaddah, such as the end of the first verse of the Sūrat "al-Falaq":

Waṣl 
Waṣl is the rule of not pronouncing alif as a glottal stop /ʔ/, assimilating to its adjacent vowel. It is indicated with the diacritic waṣlah, a small ṣād on the letter alif (ٱ). In Arabic, words starting with alif not using a hamzah (ا) receive a waṣlah...

In most of the cases, the vowel that must be used before the alif waṣlah is obvious (the short or long vowel before alif waṣlah); but if it is preceded by a word ending on a sukun, then these are the rules:

1 In the case of Tanwin and alif waṣlah, the intrusive kasrah between them is not graphically represented.

2 Plural mim is the ending of هُمْ or كُمْ as noun suffixes and تُمْ as a verb suffix, which normally end as /hum/, /kum/ and /tum/ respectively. But in some cases /hum/ becomes /him/; nevertheless, it continues as /him-u/. These three always take a damma /-u/.

3 مِنْ is an exception to this, which always takes a fatha /-a/ if it be conjoined with the next word.

Waqf 
Waqf is the Arabic pausa rule; all words whose last letter end on a harakah become mute (sukūn) when being the last word of a sentence.

1 Hamza on the fourth row is an exception to 'ending on any ḥarakah.' It's only in the case of hamza having fathatayn, not otherwise.

In the case of the proper name عمرو /ʕamrun/, it is pronounced /ʕamr/ in pausa, and the last letter و wāw has no phonetical value (this writing convention is merely for the differentiation from the name عُمَر /ʕumar/). And in fact, عمرو is a triptote (something rare in proper nouns, since they are usually diptotes).

See also 
 Qāriʾ
 Qira'at
 Quran reading
 Qur'anic punctuation
 Tarteel
 Tilawa

Analogous and related fields
 Elocution, the analogous modern Western study.
 Pronuntiatio, the analogous classical Western study.
 Shiksha, Hindu Vedic recital study.
 Phonetics

References

Notes

Books and journals
 
Tajwid: The Art of Recitation of the Holy Qur'an by Dr. Abdul Majid Khan, Tughra Books 2013. http://www.tughrabooks.com/books/detail/tajwid-the-art-of-the-recitation-of-the-quran
 Foundation of Tajweed
"Theory and Practice of Tajwid," Encyclopedia of Arabic Language and Linguistics, IV, Leiden, Brill, 2007 (or still in press)

Quran reciting
Phonology
Islamic terminology
Arabic language
Arabic phonology